Crystal Bridge in Crystal, North Dakota is a bridge which was built in 1927 over the Cart Creek.  It was listed on the National Register of Historic Places in 1997.

According to its NRHP nomination, the bridge "is a two-span concrete T-beam structure, some 66 feet long. Concrete T-beam designs saw occasional use in North Dakota during the first half of the twentieth century, as bridge builders began experimenting with the increased use of reinforced concrete in heavy load-bearing applications."

It was listed on the National Register of Historic Places in 1997.

It is owned and maintained by Pembina County.

References

Road bridges on the National Register of Historic Places in North Dakota
Bridges completed in 1927
National Register of Historic Places in Pembina County, North Dakota
Concrete bridges in the United States
1927 establishments in North Dakota
Transportation in Pembina County, North Dakota